Juma Sururu Juma (born 1 March 1966) is a Tanzanian CCM politician and Member of Parliament for Bububu constituency since 2010.

References

1966 births
Living people
Tanzanian Muslims
Chama Cha Mapinduzi MPs
Tanzanian MPs 2010–2015